A standard-gauge railway is a railway with a track gauge of . The standard gauge is also called Stephenson gauge (after George Stephenson), international gauge, UIC gauge, uniform gauge, normal gauge and European gauge in Europe, and SGR in East Africa. It is the most widely used track gauge around the world, with about 55% of the lines in the world using it. All high-speed rail lines use standard gauge except those in Russia, Finland, and Uzbekistan. The distance between the inside edges of the rails is defined to be 1,435 mm except in the United States and on some heritage British lines, where it is defined in U.S. customary/Imperial units as exactly "four feet eight and one half inches", which is equivalent to 1,435.1mm.

History
As railways developed and expanded, one of the key issues was the track gauge (the distance, or width, between the inner sides of the rails) to be used. Different railways used different gauges, and where rails of different gauge met – a "gauge break" – loads had to be unloaded from one set of rail cars and reloaded onto another, a time-consuming and expensive process.

Origins
A popular legend that has been around since at least 1937 traces the origin of the  gauge even further back than the coalfields of northern England, pointing to the evidence of rutted roads marked by chariot wheels dating from the Roman Empire. Snopes categorised this legend as "false", but commented, "it is perhaps more fairly labelled as 'True, but for trivial and unremarkable reasons. Research, however, has been undertaken to support the hypothesis that "the origin of the standard gauge of the railway might result from an interval of wheel ruts of prehistoric ancient carriages".

In addition, while road-travelling vehicles are typically measured from the outermost portions of the wheel rims (and some evidence shows that the first railways were measured in this way, as well), it became apparent that for vehicles travelling on rails, having main wheel flanges that fit inside the rails is better, thus the minimum distance between the wheels (and, by extension, the inside faces of the rail heads) was the important one.

English railway pioneer George Stephenson spent much of his early engineering career working for the coal mines of County Durham. He favoured  for wagonways in Northumberland and Durham, and used it on his Killingworth line. The Hetton and Springwell wagonways also used this gauge.

Stephenson's Stockton and Darlington railway (S&DR) was built primarily to transport coal from mines near Shildon to the port at Stockton-on-Tees. The railway used this gauge for 15 years before a change was made, debuting around 1850, to the  gauge. The historic Mount Washington Cog Railway, the world's first mountain-climbing rack railway, is still in operation in the 21st century, and has used the earlier  gauge since its inauguration in 1868.

George Stephenson used the  gauge (including a belated extra  of free movement to reduce binding on curves) for the Liverpool and Manchester Railway, authorised in 1826 and opened 30 September 1830. The success of this project led to Stephenson and his son Robert being employed to engineer several other larger railway projects. Thus the  gauge became widespread and dominant in Britain. "I would take a few inches more, but a very few".

During the "gauge war" with the Great Western Railway, standard gauge was called "narrow gauge", in contrast to the Great Western's  broad gauge. The modern use of the term "narrow gauge" for gauges less than standard did not arise for many years, until the first such locomotive-hauled passenger railway, the Ffestiniog Railway was built.

Adoption
In 1845, in the United Kingdom of Great Britain and Ireland, a Royal Commission on Railway Gauges reported in favour of a standard gauge. In Great Britain, Stephenson's gauge was chosen on the grounds that existing lines of this gauge were eight times longer than those of the rival  (later ) gauge adopted principally by the Great Western Railway. It allowed the broad-gauge companies in Great Britain to continue with their tracks and expand their networks within the "Limits of Deviation" and the exceptions defined in the Act. After an intervening period of mixed-gauge operation (tracks were laid with three rails), the Great Western Railway finally completed the conversion of its network to standard gauge in 1892. The British gauges converged starting from 1846 as the advantages of equipment interchange became increasingly apparent. By the 1890s, the entire network was converted to standard gauge.

The Royal Commission made no comment about small lines narrower than standard gauge (to be called "narrow gauge"), such as the Ffestiniog Railway. Thus it permitted a future multiplicity of narrow gauges in the UK. It also made no comments about future gauges in British colonies, which allowed various gauges to be adopted across the colonies.

Parts of the United States, mainly in the Northeast, adopted the same gauge, because some early trains were purchased from Britain. The American gauges converged, as the advantages of equipment interchange became increasingly apparent. Notably, all the  broad gauge track in the South was converted to "almost standard" gauge  over the course of two days beginning on 31 May 1886. See Track gauge in the United States.

In continental Europe, France and Belgium adopted a  gauge (measured between the midpoints of each rail's profile) for their early railways.

The modern method of measuring rail gauge was agreed in the first Berne rail convention of 1886, according to the "Revue générale des chemins de fer, July 1928".

Early railways by gauge

Non-standard gauge
 Monkland and Kirkintilloch Railway, authorised 1824 and opened 1825, used .
 Dundee and Newtyle Railway, authorised 1829 and opened 1831, used .
 The Eastern Counties Railway, authorised on 4 July 1836, used 
 The London and Blackwall Railway, authorised on 28 July 1836, used .
 The Dundee and Arbroath Railway, incorporated on 19 May 1836 and opened October 1838, used  until standardised in 1847.
 The Arbroath and Forfar Railway, incorporated on 19 May 1836 and opened November 1838, used .
 The Northern and Eastern Railway, authorised on 4 July 1836, used  gauge.
 Aberdeen Railway, opened 1848, used  until standardised.

Almost standard gauge

 The Huddersfield Corporation Tramways, used 
 The Portsdown and Horndean Light Railway, used 
 The Portsmouth Corporation Transport, used 
 The Killingworth colliery railway, used .
 The Hetton colliery railway, opened 1822, used .
 The Stockton and Darlington Railway, authorised 1821, opened 1825, used .
 The New Orleans and Carrollton Railroad used 
 The Pontchartrain Railroad used 
 The trams in Nuremberg nominally used  during much of their existence, but have since been converted to standard gauge in name as well as fact.

Standard gauge
 The Baltimore and Ohio Railroad, begun 1827, opened 1830.
 The Liverpool and Manchester Railway, authorised 1824, opened 1830.
 The Dublin and Kingstown Railway, authorised 1831, opened for passenger traffic 1834.
 The Newcastle & Carlisle Railway, authorised 1829, opened 1834, isolated from LMR.
 The Grand Junction Railway, authorised 1833, opened 1837, connected to LMR.
 The London and Birmingham Railway, authorised 1833, opened 1838, connected to LMR.
 The Manchester and Birmingham Railway, authorised 1837, opened 1840, connected to LMR.
 The Birmingham and Gloucester Railway, authorised 1836, opened 1840, connected to LMR.
 The London and Southampton Railway, authorised 1834, opened 1840.
 The London and Brighton Railway, authorised 1837, opened 1841.
 The South Eastern Railway, authorised 1836, opened 1844.

Small deviations on standard gauge
 The Manchester and Leeds Railway, authorised on 4 July 1836, used .
 The  railways were intended to take  gauge vehicles and allow a (second) running tolerance.
 The Chester and Birkenhead Railway, authorised on 12 July 1837, used .
 The London and Brighton Railway, authorised on 15 July 1837, used .
 The Manchester and Birmingham Railway, authorised on 30 June 1837, used .
 The Pennsylvania Railroad originally used 
 The trams in Dresden, authorised in 1872 as horsecars, used  gauge vehicles. Converted to 600 V DC electric trams in 1893, they now use ; both gauges are within the tolerance for standard gauge.
 The Ohio gauge of

Dual gauge

Initially standard gauge 
Several lines were initially build as standard gauge but were later converted to another gauge for cost or for compatibility reasons.
 South Africa became 
 Thailand became 
 Indonesia became 
 Ireland became  - Dublin and Kingstown Railway
 Australia became  - Victoria & South Australia - partly converted to 
 India became  - initial freight lines 
 some private Japanese railways

Modern almost standard gauge railways
The Toronto Transit Commission light-metro lines and light-rail lines (whether existing, under construction or proposed) use standard gauge.
 Trams in Leipzig, Germany use . 
 Trams in Dresden, Germany use . 
  gauge is in use on several urban rail transit systems in Europe:
 Trams in Italy
 Madrid Metro (only metro system. Light rail system uses standard gauge.)
 The MTR in Hong Kong uses  gauge on lines owned by the MTR Corporation. However, lines formerly operated (but which continue to be owned) by the Kowloon-Canton Railway Corporation, including the Light Rail network, use  gauge. New lines and extensions to the MTR after 2014 use  gauge, including the South Island line, Kwun Tong line extension and West Island line.
 The Bucharest Metro uses  gauge.
 The Washington Metro uses ,  narrower than standard gauge.
 The Mount Washington Cog Railway, the world's oldest mountain-climbing rack-and-pinion railway, uses a  gauge.

Railways

Non-rail use

Several states in the United States had laws requiring road vehicles to have a consistent gauge to allow them to follow ruts in the road. Those gauges were similar to railway standard gauge.

See also

 Standard Gauge (toy trains)
 
 List of tram systems by gauge and electrification
 Track gauge
 Regulating the Gauge of Railways Act 1846

Notes

References

Bibliography

External links
 , a discussion of gauge in Australia circa 1892
 , a discussion of the Roman gauge origin theory.

Track gauges by size
Track gauges by name